"Give You My Heart" (Korean: 마음을 드려요; ma-eum-eul deulyeoyo) is a song recorded by South Korean singer IU for the soundtrack of the drama series Crash Landing on You. It was released as a digital single on February 15, 2020 by EDAM Entertainment.

Release
The song was released through various music portals, including iTunes.

Track listing

Commercial performance
"Give You My Heart" was ranked first on major streaming sites, such as Soribada, Genie Music and Bugs later earning an all-kill certificate for reaching the top of all digital charts in Korea.  The song debuted at number 71 on South Korea's Gaon Digital Chart for the chart issue dated  February 9–15, 2020 rising and reaching number one on the following week.

Charts

References 

2020 songs
2020 singles
Korean-language songs
IU (singer) songs
Gaon Digital Chart number-one singles